Conservative Party leadership elections were held in the following countries in 2022:

2022 Conservative Party of Canada leadership election
July–September 2022 Conservative Party leadership election (UK)
October 2022 Conservative Party leadership election (UK)

See also 
2022 United Conservative Party leadership election
Endorsements for the 2022 Conservative Party of Canada leadership election
Endorsements in the July–September 2022 Conservative Party leadership election
Endorsements in the October 2022 Conservative Party leadership election